The 2012 ATS Formel 3 Cup was the tenth edition of the German F3 Cup and the inaugural edition with one-make Volkswagen Power Engines. The Cup class is open for cars built between 2008 and 2011 and equipped with the new Volkswagen engine, while cars built between 2002 and 2007 with conventional Formula Three engines will race in the Trophy class. The season began on 4 May at Circuit Park Zandvoort and ended on 30 September at Hockenheim after nine race weekends, totalling 27 races.

Lotus driver Jimmy Eriksson became the first and only Swedish driver to win the championship. He clinched the title after taking points in the Hockenheim qualifying. He surpassed champion of the Rookie class Lucas Auer and Kimiya Sato by 110 and 127 respectively points. André Rudersdorf won the Trophy class, as his main rival Luca Stolz stepped up to the Cup class in the second half of the season.

Teams and drivers

Race calendar and results
The 2012 calendar consists of nine meetings, of which five take place on German soil while neighbouring Netherlands, Belgium and Austria will host the remaining four rounds. The F3 Cup will be part of the ADAC Masters Weekend package seven times; GAMMA Race Day at Assen is once again part of the German F3 schedule with an International Superstars Series support round at Spa-Francorchamps. The series will adopt a format used in British Formula 3 and the Formula 3 Euro Series, with three races a weekend, two of which held on the Saturday and the final race on the Sunday.

 The rounds at Spa and Assen will be invitation rounds.

Championship standings

Cup
 Cars built over the period of 2008–2011, and equipped with the Volkswagen Power Engine are eligible for Cup points.
 Cars built between 2002 and 2007 are eligible for Trophy points; points are awarded as follows:

† — Drivers did not finish the race, but were classified as they completed over 90% of the race distance.

SONAX Rookie-Pokal
Rookie drivers are only eligible for the SONAX Rookie-Pokal title, if they have not previously competed in more than two events of national or international Formula 3 racing, and are 25 years old or younger in 2012.

† — Drivers did not finish the race, but were classified as they completed over 90% of the race distance.

References

External links
 

German Formula Three Championship seasons
German Formula Three
German
German Formula 3 Championship